Sonata (Italian: , pl. sonate; from Latin and Italian: sonare [archaic Italian; replaced in the modern language by suonare], "to sound"), in music, literally means a piece played as opposed to a cantata (Latin and Italian cantare, "to sing"), a piece sung. The term evolved through the history of music, designating a variety of forms until the Classical era, when it took on increasing importance. Sonata is a vague term, with varying meanings depending on the context and time period. By the early 19th century, it came to represent a principle of composing large-scale works. It was applied to most instrumental genres and regarded—alongside the fugue—as one of two fundamental methods of organizing, interpreting and analyzing concert music. Though the musical style of sonatas has changed since the Classical era, most 20th- and 21st-century sonatas still maintain the same structure.

The term sonatina, pl. sonatine, the diminutive form of sonata, is often used for a short or technically easy sonata.

Instrumentation
In the Baroque period, a sonata was for one or more instruments almost always with continuo. After the Baroque period most works designated as sonatas specifically are performed by a solo instrument, most often a keyboard instrument, or by a solo instrument accompanied by a keyboard instrument.

Sonatas for a solo instrument other than keyboard have been composed, as have sonatas for other combinations of instruments.

History

Baroque 

In the works of Arcangelo Corelli and his contemporaries, two broad classes of sonata were established, and were first described by Sébastien de Brossard in his Dictionaire de musique (third edition, Amsterdam, ca. 1710): the sonata da chiesa (that is, suitable for use in church), which was the type "rightly known as Sonatas", and the sonata da camera (proper for use at court), which consists of a prelude followed by a succession of dances, all in the same key. Although the four, five, or six movements of the sonata da chiesa are also most often in one key, one or two of the internal movements are sometimes in a contrasting tonality.

The sonata da chiesa, generally for one or more violins and bass, consisted normally of a slow introduction, a loosely fugued allegro, a cantabile slow movement, and a lively finale in some binary form suggesting affinity with the dance-tunes of the suite. This scheme, however, was not very clearly defined, until the works of Arcangelo Corelli when it became the essential sonata and persisted as a tradition of Italian violin music.

The sonata da camera consisted almost entirely of idealized dance-tunes. On the other hand, the features of sonata da chiesa and sonata da camera then tended to be freely intermixed. Although nearly half of Johann Sebastian Bach's 1,100 surviving compositions, arrangements, and transcriptions are instrumental works, only about 4% are sonatas.

The term sonata is also applied to the series of over 500 works for harpsichord solo, or sometimes for other keyboard instruments, by Domenico Scarlatti, originally published under the name Essercizi per il gravicembalo (Exercises for the Harpsichord). Most of these pieces are in one binary-form movement only, with two parts that are in the same tempo and use the same thematic material, though occasionally there will be changes in tempo within the sections. They are frequently virtuosic, and use more distant harmonic transitions and modulations than were common for other works of the time. They were admired for their great variety and invention.

Both the solo and trio sonatas of Vivaldi show parallels with the concerti he was writing at the same time. He composed over 70 sonatas, the great majority of which are of the solo type; most of the rest are trio sonatas, and a very small number are of the multivoice type.

The sonatas of Domenico Paradies are mild and elongated works with a graceful and melodious little second movement included.

Classical period
The practice of the Classical period would become decisive for the sonata; the term moved from being one of many terms indicating genres or forms, to designating the fundamental form of organization for large-scale works. This evolution stretched over fifty years. The term came to apply both to the structure of individual movements (see Sonata form and History of sonata form) and to the layout of the movements in a multi-movement work. In the transition to the Classical period there were several names given to multimovement works, including divertimento, serenade, and partita, many of which are now regarded effectively as sonatas. The usage of sonata as the standard term for such works began somewhere in the 1770s. Haydn labels his first piano sonata as such in 1771, after which the term divertimento is used sparingly in his output. The term sonata was increasingly applied to either a work for keyboard alone (see piano sonata), or for keyboard and one other instrument, often the violin or cello. It was less and less frequently applied to works with more than two instrumentalists; for example, piano trios were not often labelled sonata for piano, violin, and cello.

Initially the most common layout of movements was:

 Allegro, which at the time was understood to mean not only a tempo, but also some degree of "working out", or development, of the theme.
 A middle movement, most frequently a slow movement: an Andante, an Adagio or a Largo; or less frequently a Minuet or Theme and Variations form.
 A closing movement was generally an Allegro or a Presto, often labeled Finale. The form was often a Rondo or Minuet.

However, two-movement layouts also occur, a practice Haydn uses as late as the 1790s. There was also in the early Classical period the possibility of using four movements, with a dance movement inserted before the slow movement, as in Haydn's Piano sonatas No. 6 and No. 8. Mozart's sonatas were also primarily in three movements. Of the works that Haydn labelled piano sonata, divertimento, or partita in Hob XIV, seven are in two movements, thirty-five are in three, and three are in four; and there are several in three or four movements whose authenticity is listed as "doubtful." Composers such as Boccherini would publish sonatas for piano and obbligato instrument with an optional third movement—–in Boccherini's case, 28 cello sonatas.

But increasingly instrumental works were laid out in four, not three movements, a practice seen first in string quartets and symphonies, and reaching the sonata proper in the early sonatas of Beethoven. However, two- and three-movement sonatas continued to be written throughout the Classical period: Beethoven's opus 102 pair has a two-movement C major sonata and a three-movement D major sonata. Nevertheless, works with fewer or more than four movements were increasingly felt to be exceptions; they were labelled as having movements "omitted," or as having "extra" movements.

Thus, the four-movement layout was by this point standard for the string quartet, and overwhelmingly the most common for the symphony. The usual order of the four movements was:

 An allegro, which by this point was in what is called sonata form, complete with exposition, development, and recapitulation.
 A slow movement, an Andante, an Adagio or a Largo.
 A dance movement, frequently Minuet and trio or—especially later in the classical period—a Scherzo and trio.
 A finale in faster tempo, often in a sonata–rondo form.

When movements appeared out of this order they would be described as "reversed", such as the scherzo coming before the slow movement in Beethoven's 9th Symphony. This usage would be noted by critics in the early 19th century, and it was codified into teaching soon thereafter.

It is difficult to overstate the importance of Beethoven's output of sonatas: 32 piano sonatas, plus sonatas for cello and piano or violin and piano, forming a large body of music that would over time increasingly be thought essential for any serious instrumentalist to master.

Romantic period
In the early 19th century, the current usage of the term sonata was established, both as regards form per se, and in the sense that a fully elaborated sonata serves as a norm for concert music in general, which other forms are seen in relation to. From this point forward, the word sonata in music theory labels as much the abstract musical form as particular works. Hence there are references to a symphony as a sonata for orchestra. This is referred to by William Newman as the sonata idea.

Among works expressly labeled sonata for the piano, there are the three of Frédéric Chopin, those of Felix Mendelssohn, the three of Robert Schumann, Franz Liszt's Sonata in B minor, and later the sonatas of Johannes Brahms and Sergei Rachmaninoff.

In the early 19th century, the sonata form was defined, from a combination of previous practice and the works of important Classical composers, particularly Haydn, Mozart, Beethoven, but composers such as Clementi also. It is during this period that the differences between the three- and the four-movement layouts became a subject of commentary, with emphasis on the concerto being laid out in three movements, and the symphony in four.

Ernest Newman wrote in the essay "Brahms and the Serpent":

That, perhaps, will be the ideal of the instrumental music of the future; the way to it, indeed, seems at last to be opening out before modern composers in proportion as they discard the last tiresome vestiges of sonata form. This, from being what it was originally, the natural mode of expression of a certain eighteenth century way of thinking in music, became in the nineteenth century a drag upon both individual thinking and the free unfolding of the inner vital force of an idea, and is now simply a shop device by which a bad composer may persuade himself and the innocent reader of textbooks that he is a good one.

After the Romantic period
The role of the sonata as an extremely important form of extended musical argument would inspire composers such as Hindemith, Prokofiev, Shostakovich, Tailleferre, Ustvolskaya, and Williams to compose in sonata form, and works with traditional sonata structures continue to be composed and performed.

Scholarship and musicology

Sonata idea or principle 
Research into the practice and meaning of sonata form, style, and structure has been the motivation for important theoretical works by Heinrich Schenker, Arnold Schoenberg, and Charles Rosen among others; and the pedagogy of music continued to rest on an understanding and application of the rules of sonata form as almost two centuries of development in practice and theory had codified it.

The development of the classical style and its norms of composition formed the basis for much of the music theory of the 19th and 20th centuries. As an overarching formal principle, sonata was accorded the same central status as Baroque fugue; generations of composers, instrumentalists, and audiences were guided by this understanding of sonata as an enduring and dominant principle in Western music. The sonata idea begins before the term had taken on its present importance, along with the evolution of the Classical period's changing norms. The reasons for these changes, and how they relate to the evolving sense of a new formal order in music, is a matter to which research is devoted. Some common factors which were pointed to include: the shift of focus from vocal music to instrumental music; changes in performance practice, including the loss of the continuo.

Crucial to most interpretations of the sonata form is the idea of a tonal center; and, as the Grove Concise Dictionary of Music puts it: "The main form of the group embodying the 'sonata principle', the most important principle of musical structure from the Classical period to the 20th century: that material first stated in a complementary key be restated in the home key".(

The sonata idea has been thoroughly explored by William Newman in his monumental three-volume work Sonata in the Classic Era (A History of the Sonata Idea), begun in the 1950s and published in what has become the standard edition of all three volumes in 1972.

20th-century theory
Heinrich Schenker argued that there was an Urlinie or basic tonal melody, and a basic bass figuration. He held that when these two were present, there was basic structure, and that the sonata represented this basic structure in a whole work with a process known as interruption.

As a practical matter, Schenker applied his ideas to the editing of the piano sonatas of Beethoven, using original manuscripts and his own theories to "correct" the available sources. The basic procedure was the use of tonal theory to infer meaning from available sources as part of the critical process, even to the extent of completing works left unfinished by their composers. While many of these changes were and are controversial, that procedure has a central role today in music theory, and is an essential part of the theory of sonata structure as taught in most music schools.

Notable sonatas

Baroque (c. 1600 – c. 1760)
 Johann Sebastian Bach
 Sonatas for solo violin (BWV 1001, 1003 and 1005)
 Sonatas for flute and continuo (BWV 1034, 1035)
 Trio sonatas: for organ (BWV 525–530); for violin and harpsichord (BWV 1014–1019); for viola da gamba and harpsichord (BWV 1027–1029); for flute and harpsichord (BWV 1030, 1032); for flute, violin and continuo (Sonata sopr'il Soggetto Reale included in The Musical Offering)
 Heinrich Ignaz Franz Biber
 Rosary Sonatas
 George Frideric Handel
 Sonata for Violin and Continuo in D major (HWV 371)
 Giuseppe Tartini
 Devil's Trill Sonata
 Domenico Scarlatti
 List of solo keyboard sonatas by Domenico Scarlatti

Classical (c. 1760 – c. 1830)
 Wolfgang Amadeus Mozart
 Piano Sonata No. 8 in A minor (K. 310)
 Piano Sonata No. 11 in A major (K. 331/300i)
 Piano Sonata No. 12 in F major (K. 332)
 Piano Sonata No. 13 in B-flat major (K. 333)
 Piano Sonata No. 14 in C minor (K. 457)
 Piano Sonata No. 15 in F major (K. 533/494)
 Piano Sonata No. 16 in C major (K. 545)
 Sonata in A for Violin and Keyboard (K. 526)
 Franz Joseph Haydn
 Sonata No. 1 in C major, Hob. XVI:1 – Piano Sonata No. 62, Hob.XVI:52
 Franz Schubert
 Sonata in C minor, D. 958
 Sonata in A major, D. 959
 Sonata in B major, D. 960

Romantic (c. 1795 – c. 1900)
 Ludwig van Beethoven
 Piano Sonata No. 8 "Pathétique"
 Piano Sonata No. 14 "Moonlight" (Sonata quasi una fantasia)
 Piano Sonata No. 17 "Tempest"
 Piano Sonata No. 19 "Leichte"
 Piano Sonata No. 21 "Waldstein"
 Piano Sonata No. 23 "Appassionata"
 Piano Sonata No. 29 "Hammerklavier"
 Piano Sonata No. 32 in C minor, Op. 111
 Violin Sonata No. 5 "Spring"
 Violin Sonata No. 9 "Kreutzer"
 Cello Sonata No. 1 in F major Op. 5
 Cello Sonata No. 2 in G minor Op. 5
 Cello Sonata No. 3 in A major Op. 69
 Johannes Brahms
 Cello Sonata No. 1
 Cello Sonata No. 2
 Clarinet Sonatas No. 1 and No.2
 Violin Sonata No. 1
 Violin Sonata No. 2
 Violin Sonata No. 3
 Johannes Brahms, Albert Dietrich, and Robert Schumann
 'F-A-E' Sonata
 Frédéric Chopin
 Piano Sonata No. 2 in B minor
 Piano Sonata No. 3 in B minor
 Paul Dukas
 Piano Sonata in E-flat minor (1900)
 George Enescu
 Sonata No. 1 for violin and piano in D major, Op. 2 (1897)
 Sonata No. 2 for violin and piano in F minor, Op. 6 (1899)
 Edvard Grieg
 Three sonatas for Violin and Piano
 Franz Liszt
 Sonata after a Reading of Dante (Fantasia Quasi Sonata)
 Sonata in B minor
 Robert Schumann
 Violin Sonata No. 1 in A minor, Op. 105

20th-century and contemporary (c. 1910–present)
 Samuel Barber
 Cello Sonata Op. 6
 Piano Sonata Op. 26 (1949)
 Jean Barraqué
 Piano Sonata (1950–52)
 Béla Bartók
 Sonata for Two Pianos and Percussion
 Sonata for Piano (1926)
 Sonata for Solo Violin
 Sonata No. 1 for Violin and Piano
 Sonata No. 2 for Violin and Piano
 Alban Berg
 Sonata for Piano, Op. 1
 Leonard Bernstein
 Sonata for Clarinet and Piano
 Pierre Boulez
 Piano Sonata No. 1
 Piano Sonata No. 2
 Piano Sonata No. 3
 Benjamin Britten
 Sonata for Cello and Piano, Op. 65
 John Cage
 Sonata for Unaccompanied Clarinet
 Sonatas and Interludes for Prepared Piano (1946–48)
 Claude Debussy
 Sonata No. 1, for cello and piano (1915)
 Sonata No. 2, for flute, viola and harp (1915)
 Sonata No. 3, for violin and piano (1916–1917)
 George Enescu
 Sonata No. 3 for violin and piano, in A minor, dans le caractère populaire roumain Op. 25 (1926)
 Sonata No. 2 for cello and piano in C major, Op. 26, No. 2 (1935)
 Piano Sonata No. 1 in F minor, Op. 24, No. 1 (1924)
 Piano Sonata No. 3 in D major, Op. 24, No. 3 (1933–1935)
 Karel Goeyvaerts
 Sonata for Two Pianos, Op. 1
 Hans Werner Henze
 Royal Winter Music, Guitar Sonatas No. 1 and 2
 Paul Hindemith
 Sonata for Viola and Piano, Op. 11, No. 4 (1919)
 Charles Ives
 Piano Sonata No. 2, Concord, Mass., 1840–60
 Leoš Janáček
 1. X. 1905 (Janáček's Sonata for Piano)
 Ben Johnston
 Sonata for Microtonal Piano
 György Ligeti
 Sonata, for solo cello (1948/1953)
 Nikolai Medtner
 Piano Sonata No. 1 in F minor, Op. 5 (1901-3)
 Piano Sonata No. 2 in A, Op. 11 (1904-7)
 Piano Sonata No. 3 in D minor, Sonate-Elegie, Op. 11 (1904-7)
 Piano Sonata No. 4 in C, Op. 11 (1904-7)
 Piano Sonata No. 5 in G minor, Op. 22 (1909-10)
 Piano Sonata No. 6 in C minor, Sonata-Skazka, Op. 22 (1910-11)
 Piano Sonata No. 7 in E minor, Night Wind, Op. 22 (1910-11)
 Piano Sonata No. 8 in F, Sonata-Ballade, Op. 27 (1912-14)
 Piano Sonata No. 9 in A minor, War Sonata , Op. 30 (1914-17)
 Piano Sonata No. 10 in A minor, Sonata-reminiscenza, Op. 38 No. 1 (1920)
 Piano Sonata No. 11 in C minor, Sonata Tragica, Op. 39, No. 5 (1920)
 Piano Sonata No. 12 in B minor, Romantica, Op. 53 No. 1 (1930)
 Piano Sonata No. 13 in F minor, Minacciosa, Op. 53, No. 2 (1930)
 Piano Sonata No. 14 in G, Sonata-Idyll, Op. 56 (1937)
 Darius Milhaud
 Sonata for flute, oboe, clarinet, and piano, Op. 47 (1918)
 Sergei Prokofiev
 Piano Sonatas—six juvenile (1904, 1907, 1907, 1907–08, 1908, 1908–09)
 Piano Sonata No. 1 in F minor, Op. 1 (1907–09)
 Piano Sonata No. 2 in D minor, Op. 14 (1912)
 Piano Sonata No. 3 in A minor, Op. 28 (1907–17)
 Piano Sonata No. 4 in C minor, Op. 29 (1917)
 Piano Sonata No. 5 in C major (original version), Op. 38 (1923)
 Violin Sonata No. 1 in F minor, Op. 80 (1938–46)
 Piano Sonata No. 6 in A major, Op. 82 (1939–40)
 Piano Sonata No. 7 in B-flat major, Stalingrad, Op. 83 (1939–42)
 Piano Sonata No. 8 in B-flat major, Op. 84 (1939–44)
 Flute Sonata in D major, Op. 94 (1943)
 Violin Sonata No. 2 in D major, Op. 94 bis (1943)
 Piano Sonata No. 9 in C major, Op. 103 (1947)
 Sonata for Solo Violin (Unison Violins) in D major, Op. 115
 Cello Sonata in C major, Op. 119
 Sonata for Solo Cello in C-sharp minor, Op. 133
 Piano Sonata No. 5 in C major (revised version), Op. 135 (1952–53)
 Sergei Rachmaninoff
 Piano Sonata No. 2 in B-flat minor, Op. 36 (1913, revised in 1931)
 Sonata for Cello and Piano in G minor, Op. 19 (1901)
 Alexander Scriabin
 Piano Sonata No. 2 (Sonata-Fantasy)
 Piano Sonata No. 3
 Piano Sonata No. 4
 Piano Sonata No. 5
 Piano Sonata No. 6
 Piano Sonata No. 7 "White Mass"
 Piano Sonata No. 8
 Piano Sonata No. 9 "Black Mass"
 Piano Sonata No. 10
 Kaikhosru Shapurji Sorabji
 Piano Sonata No. 0
 Piano Sonata No. 1
 Piano Sonata No. 2
 Piano Sonata No. 3
 Piano Sonata No. 4
 Piano Sonata No. 5 "Opus Archimagicum"
 Igor Stravinsky
 Sonata for Two Pianos (1943)
 Eugène Ysaÿe
 Six Sonatas for solo violin  (1923)

References

Sources

Further reading

 Mangsen, Sandra, John Irving, John Rink, and Paul Griffiths. 2001. "Sonata". The New Grove Dictionary of Music and Musicians, second edition, edited by Stanley Sadie and John Tyrrell. London: Macmillan.
 Newman, William S. 1966. The Sonata in the Baroque Era, revised ed. Chapel Hill: The University of North Carolina Press. LCCN 66-19475.
 Newman, William S. 1972b. The Sonata in the Classic Era: The Second Volume of a History of the Sonata Idea, second edition. A History of the Sonata Idea 2; The Norton Library N623. New York: W. W. Norton. .
 Newman, William S. 1983a. The Sonata in the Baroque Era, fourth edition. A History of the Sonata Idea 1. New York: W. W. Norton. .
 Newman, William S. 1983b. The Sonata in the Classic Era, third edition. A History of the Sonata Idea 2. New York: W. W. Norton. .
 Newman, William S. 1983c. The Sonata since Beethoven, third edition. A History of the Sonata Idea 3. New York: W. W. Norton. .
 Newman, William S. 1988. Beethoven on Beethoven: Playing His Piano Music His Way. New York: W. W. Norton.  (cloth)  (pbk).
 Rosen, Charles. 1995. The Romantic Generation. Cambridge: Harvard University Press.   (pbk).
 Salzer, Felix. 1962. Structural Hearing: Tonal Coherence in Music. New York: Dover Publications. 
 Schoenberg, Arnold. 1966. Harmonielehre, 7th edition. Vienna: Universal-Edition. .

 
Classical music styles